Ochetellus vinsoni is a specie of ant in the genus Ochetellus. Described by Donisthorpe in 1946, the species is endemic to Mauritius.

References

Dolichoderinae
Insects described in 1946
Insects of Mauritius
Hymenoptera of Africa
Endemic fauna of Mauritius